is a city located in Ibaraki Prefecture, Japan. , the city had an estimated population of 41,638 in 16,021 households and a population density of 515 persons per km². The percentage of the population aged over 65 was 29.0%.

Geography
Shimotsuma is located in western Ibaraki Prefecture. The Kinugawa River flows through the city.

Surrounding municipalities
Ibaraki Prefecture
 Yachiyo
 Jōsō
 Tsukuba
 Chikusei

Climate
Shimotsuma has a Humid continental climate (Köppen Cfa) characterized by warm summers and cool winters with light snowfall.

Demographics
Per Japanese census data, the population of Shimotsuma peaked around the year 2000 and has declined slightly since.

History
Shimotsuma developed as a castle town from the Muromachi period. It was the center of Shimotsuma Domain under the Tokugawa shogunate during the Edo period. The town of Shimotsuma was established on April 1, 1889 with the establishment of the modern municipalities system. It was elevated to city status on January 1, 1955.

On January 1, 2006, the village of Chiyokawa (from Yūki District) was merged into Shimotsuma.

Government
Shimotsuma has a mayor-council form of government with a directly elected mayor and a unicameral city council of 20 members. Shimotsuma contributes one member to the Ibaraki Prefectural Assembly. In terms of national politics, the city is part of Ibaraki 1st district of the lower house of the Diet of Japan.

Economy
The economy of Shimotsuma is primarily agricultural.

Education
Shimotsuma has nine public elementary schools and three public middle schools operated by the city government, and two public high schools operated by the Ibaraki Prefectural Board of Education. The prefecture also operates a special education school for the handicapped.

A Brazilian school Escola Pingo de Gente was formerly located in Shimotsuma. It has since been renamed to Instituto Educare and moved to Tsukuba.

Transportation

Railway
Kantō Railway Jōsō Line
  -  -  - .

Highway

Local attractions
Tsukuba Circuit
 Site of Shimotsuma Castle
 Lake Sanuma

Noted people from Shimotsuma
Maki Tsukada, Olympic judoka
Yasuhiro Awano, Olympic judoka

In popular culture
The city is the setting of Takemoto Novala's novel Shimotsuma Monogatari (also known as Kamikaze Girls), and the manga and film of that name. The movie was filmed on location in Shimotsuma.

References

External links

Official Website 

 
Cities in Ibaraki Prefecture